Travis Meyer may refer to:
Travis Meyer (meteorologist), American television meteorologist for KOTV-DT in Tulsa, Oklahoma
Travis Meyer (cyclist) (born 1989), Australian professional racing cyclist